P.I.P.S. is a term (recursive acronym) for Symbian software libraries, and means "P.I.P.S. Is POSIX on Symbian OS". It is intended to help C language programmers in migration of desktop and server middleware, applications to Symbian OS based mobile smartphone devices.

Software libraries
The PIPS software libraries provides C and C++ application programming interfaces in standard C libraries such as

 POSIX
 libc – The "C Standard Library" with system APIs mapped to Symbian OS APIs for better performance
 libm – A mathematical library
 libpthread – Implements POSIX-style threading support in terms of the underlying Symbian OS thread support
 libdl – Implements POSIX-style dynamic linking which extends the dynamic loading model of Symbian OS
 LIBZ
 libz
 OpenSSL
 libcrypt
 libcrypto
 libssl
 GNOME
 libglib

Limitations
The P.I.P.S. environment does not support true signalling. Basic signal support is emulated using threads.

Extensions and successors: Open C and Open C++
Open C and Open C++ are extensions by Nokia of P.I.P.S. In contrast to mere P.I.P.S., they were only for Series 60 phones.

Naming
The name was the result of an internal competition in the Symbian Developer Marketing department, organised by Bruce Carney (Developer Marketing) and Erik Jacobson (Product Manager). The full-stops were inserted by Symbian's Legal department to ensure there were no trademark or copyright infringements.

See also
 POSIX
 POSIX Threads
 C POSIX library

References

External links
 P.I.P.S. – Nokia Developer Wiki – page does not exist 
 A Guide To P.I.P.S. – Nokia Developer Wiki – page does not exist

ISO standards
IEEE standards
Unix
POSIX
S60 (software platform)